Madeleine Péloquin is a Canadian actress from Quebec. She is most noted for her performance in the 2011 film For the Love of God (Pour l'amour de Dieu), for which she received a Jutra Award nomination for Best Actress at the 14th Jutra Awards in 2012.

Filmography

Film
 Continental, a Film Without Guns (Continental, un film sans fusil) - 2007
 L'amour m… ou autres adjectifs - 2007
 Avant-goût de printemps - 2008
 For the Love of God (Pour l'amour de Dieu) - 2011
 Gerry - 2011
 Nitro Rush - 2016
 Junior Majeur - 2017

Television
 Chartrand et Simonne : Lysiane Gagnon - 2003
 Casting... à l'école de la vie! : Vinny Fitzpatrick - 2005
 C.A. : Mado - 2006-10
 Octobre 70 : Suzanne Lanctôt - 2007
 Les Lavigueur, la vraie histoire : animatrice télé - 2008
 Stan et ses stars : Stefka - 2008-09
 Grande fille : Maude - 2008-09
 Trauma : Martine Laliberté - 2010-14
 Rock et Rolland : Vinny - 2010-13
 30 vies : Patricia Fillion - 2013
 La Galère : Marianne - 2013
 Au secours de Béatrice : Julie Lachapelle - 2014-18
 Ces gars-là : Audrey Hétu - 2015
 [Pour Sarah : Sophie - 2015
 Mirador : Patricia Desjardins - 2016
 Les Pays d'en haut : Angélique Pothier - 2016
 Web Thérapie : Monique Morin - 2017
 Béliveau : Élise Béliveau, jeune - 2017
 Alerte Amber : Valérie Sénéchal - 2019

References

External links

21st-century Canadian actresses
Canadian film actresses
Canadian television actresses
Actresses from Quebec
National Theatre School of Canada alumni
Living people
Year of birth missing (living people)